Palakkad State Assembly constituency, once known as Palghat constituency, is one of the 140 state legislative assembly constituencies at the state Kerala in southern India. It is also one of the 7 state legislative assembly constituencies included in the Palakkad Lok Sabha constituency. As of the 2021 assembly elections, the current MLA is Shafi Parambil of INC.

Local self governed segments
Palakkad Niyamasabha constituency is composed of the following local self governed segments:

Members of Legislative Assembly
The following list contains all members of Kerala legislative assembly who have represented Palakkad Niyamasabha Constituency during the period of various assemblies:

Key

Election history

Detailed election results
Percentage change (±%) denotes the change in the number of votes from the immediate previous election.

Niyamasabha election 2021

Niyamasabha election 2016
There were 1,78,387 eligible voters in Palakkad Constituency for the 2016 Kerala Niyamasabha election.

Niyamasabha election 2011
There were 1,54,374 eligible voters in Palakkad Constituency for the 2011 Kerala Niyamasabha election.

Niyamasabha election 1957
 Raghava Menon R. (INC): 14,873 votes  
 Kunhiraman M. P. (CPI): 14,248

1952

See also
 Palakkad
 Palakkad district
 List of constituencies of the Kerala Legislative Assembly
 2016 Kerala Legislative Assembly election

References 

Assembly constituencies of Kerala

State assembly constituencies in Palakkad district